Guan Hu (born August 1, 1968) is a sixth generation Chinese film director.

Career 
A graduate of the class of 1991 of the Beijing Film Academy, Guan became the youngest director in the Beijing Film Studio. In the 1990s, Guan directed a handful of films making a name as an important voice of the sixth generation, most notably with his debut, 1994's Dirt. A portrayal of Beijing's rock music scene, Dirt was filmed on a shoestring budget and was funded primarily by lead actress, Kong Lin.  Dirt is often compared with another major sixth generation film about the Beijing rock scene, Zhang Yuan's Beijing Bastards. Unlike that film, Guan Hu paid nearly US$2000 for state studio affiliation, allowing the film to be distributed in China and screened abroad with approval from state regulators.

Filmography

Film

Television
2017: The Weasel Grave

References

External links 
  (incomplete filmography)
  (incomplete filmography)
 Guan Hu at the Chinese Movie Database

Film directors from Beijing
Beijing Film Academy alumni
Screenwriters from Beijing
1968 births
Living people
Place of birth missing (living people)